The Reconquista was the gradual military retaking ("reconquering") of the Iberian Peninsula from the Moors.

Reconquest or Reconquista may also refer to:

 Pueblo Revolt Reconquest, the restoration of colonial government in Spanish New Mexico following the Pueblo Revolt of 1680
 Reconquista de Buenos Aires, the restoration of Spanish control of Buenos Aires in 1806; see 
 Reconquista (Spanish America), the restoration of Spanish colonial possessions in the New World, typically control of colonial governments loyal to Ferdinand VII of Spain following the Peninsular War in Europe
 Reconquest (Chile), the restoration of Spanish colonial possession of Chile during the War of Independence
 Reconquista (Colombia), the restoration of Spanish colonial possession following a rebellion in what is now Colombia; see Spanish reconquest of New Granada
 Santo Domingo / Dominican Republic:
 Reconquista (Santo Domingo), the restoration of Spanish colonial possession of Santo Domingo following a period of French occupation
 Spanish occupation of the Dominican Republic, the retaking of the former colony by Spain 17 years after it gained independence
 Spanish attempts to reconquer Mexico
 Reconquista, the restoration of Portuguese colonial possession (or joint Portuguese and Spanish rule) following periods of Dutch occupation
 Reconquest of Angola
 Recapture of Bahia
 Recapture of Recife
 Reconquista (Mexico), an irredentist movement advocating restoration of Mexican sovereignty over territories taken by the United States
 Operación Reconquista de España, the 1944 invasion of the Aran Valley by the Spanish Maquis

Places
 Reconquista, Santa Fe, a city in Argentina
 Reconquista Airport
 Roman Catholic Diocese of Reconquista
 Reconquista River, a river in the province of Buenos Aires, Argentina

Other uses
 "Reconquista", a 2011 song by Hangry & Angry
 La Reconquista de Buenos Aires, a 1909 Argentine painting commemorating a historical event

See also
 Conquista (disambiguation)
 Reconquête, a 2022 far-right French political party

Spanish words and phrases